Makole is a settlement in northeastern Slovenia. It is the seat of the Municipality of Makole. It lies in the Dravinja Valley. The area is part of the traditional region of Styria. It was first mentioned in written documents dating to 1375 and was also granted market rights.

History 

Cultural sights in the village are the parish church of St. Andrew and the late Gothic St. Leonard's Church. Jelovec Creek flows through the settlement and then flows into the Dravinja not far away.

On the  hill above Makole stand the Old Castle of Makole, and on the other side of the Dravinja Valley is Štatenberg Mansion.

A forma viva is set up along the local road.

World War II 

In 1941 and 1942, several Liberation Front groups from Makole and its surroundings connected with the Yugoslav Partisans in Maribor and Rogaška Slatina. In the summer of 1942, Axis forces discovered collaborators with the liberation movement, arrested them, shot 9 of them, and sent the rest to concentration camps. Near Makole, on February 6, 1945, Axis forces destroyed a Partisan courier station and killed 8 couriers.

Landmarks
The parish church in the settlement is dedicated to Saint Andrew and belongs to the Roman Catholic Archdiocese of Maribor. It is a Gothic building that was first mentioned in 1441. In the 18th century, it was restyled in the Baroque.

Gallery

References

External links

Makole at Geopedia

Populated places in the Municipality of Makole